

Austria
Austrian Netherlands – Prince Eugene of Savoy, Governor of the Austrian Netherlands (1716–1724)

Great Britain
Gibraltar – David Colyear, Governor of Gibraltar (1713–1720)
South Carolina – 
 Robert Daniell, Governor of South Carolina (1716–1717)
 Robert Johnson, Governor of South Carolina (1717–1719)

Netherlands
 Dutch East Indies – Christoffel van Swoll, Governor-General of the Dutch East Indies (1713–1718)
 Zeylan – Isaak Augustyn Rumpf, Governor of Zeylan (1716–1723)

Oman
 Mombasa – Nasr ibn Abdallah al-Mazru‘i, Wali of Mombasa (1698–1728)

Portugal
 Angola – 
 João Manuel de Noronha, Governor of Angola (1713–1717)
 Henrique de Figueiredo e Alarcão, Governor of Angola (1717–1722)
 Macau – D.Francisco de Alarcao Sotto-Maior, Governor of Macau (1714–1718)

Colonial governors
Colonial governors
1717